Ben Lomond is a census-designated place (CDP) in Santa Cruz County, California, United States, and also the name of the mountain to the west. The CDP includes the communities of Glen Arbor and Brackney. The population was 6,337 at the 2020 census.

History
The nearby Ben Lomond Mountain was named after the mountain in Scotland by John Burns, a Scottish man who settled on the west side of the ridge in 1851. Burns became one of the first vintners in the Santa Cruz Mountains, and is usually also credited with naming the community of Bonny Doon. The San Lorenzo River watershed contains extensive forests of Coast redwood, and was an early center of the logging/lumber industry in Santa Cruz County. The community was originally known as Pacific Mills, after a sawmill operation located there. When, in 1887, the community applied for a U.S. Post Office, residents voted to adopt the name of the mountain.

Alba School, a one-room schoolhouse, was constructed in 1895 and was in use until 1940; it later served as a library and a community center. It was destroyed in the CZU Lightning Complex fires in August 2020.

Geography
The San Lorenzo River runs through it, in what is known locally as the San Lorenzo Valley, which runs SE–NW to the east of Ben Lomond Mountain (in actuality a long ridge whose highest point has an elevation of ).

Northeast of Ben Lomond is Loch Lomond, a reservoir built on Newell Creek and named after the original Loch Lomond in Scotland.

Climate
The National Weather Service has kept weather records for Ben Lomond since 1937.

There are an average of 76 days with measurable precipitation.

Demographics

2010
At the 2010 census Ben Lomond had a population of 6,234. The racial makeup of Ben Lomond was 5,692 (91.3%) White, 32 (0.5%) African American, 51 (0.8%) Native American, 70 (1.1%) Asian, 11 (0.2%) Pacific Islander, 98 (1.6%) from other races, and 280 (4.5%) from two or more races. Hispanic or Latino of any race were 515 people (8.3%).

The census reported that 98.8% of the population lived in households and 1.2% lived in non-institutionalized group quarters.

There were 2,440 households, 730 (29.9%) had children under the age of 18 living in them, 1,326 (54.3%) were opposite-sex married couples living together, 240 (9.8%) had a female householder with no husband present, 91 (3.7%) had a male householder with no wife present.  There were 179 (7.3%) unmarried opposite-sex partnerships, and 45 (1.8%) same-sex married couples or partnerships. Of the households, 538 (22.0%) were one person and 115 (4.7%) had someone living alone who was 65 or older. The average household size was 2.52.  There were 1,657 families (67.9% of households); the average family size was 2.93.

The age distribution was 1,214 people (19.5%) under the age of 18, 512 people (8.2%) aged 18 to 24, 1,470 people (23.6%) aged 25 to 44, 2,401 people (38.5%) aged 45 to 64, and 637 people (10.2%) who were 65 or older.  The median age was 44.1 years. For every 100 females, there were 101.9 males.  For every 100 females age 18 and over, there were 101.2 males.

The homeowner vacancy rate was 0.7%; the rental vacancy rate was 3.0%. 76.5% of the population lived in owner-occupied housing units and 22.3% lived in rental housing units.

2000
At the 2000 census there were 2,364 people (6,394 by ZIP Code), 873 households, and 577 families in the CDP. The racial makeup of the CDP was 91.16% White, 0.17% African American, 0.68% Native American, 1.65% Asian, 0.13% Pacific Islander, 2.37% from other races, and 3.85% from two or more races. Hispanic or Latino of any race were 6.43%.

Of the 873 households 36.4% had children under the age of 18 living with them, 48.2% were married couples living together, 11.6% had a female householder with no husband present, and 33.8% were non-families. Of households, 21.9% were one person and 3.6% were one person aged 65 or older. The average household size was 2.66 and the average family size was 3.09.

The population was spread out, with 25.9% under the age of 18, 9.0% from 18 to 24, 32.7% from 25 to 44, 27.5% from 45 to 64, and 5.0% 65 or older. The median age was 36 years. For every 100 females, there were 105.7 males. For every 100 females age 18 and over, there were 100.0 males.

The median household income was $57,241 (but $64,813 by ZIP Code), and the median family income  was $59,412. Males had a median income of $40,602 versus $28,042 for females. The per capita income for the CDP was $25,691.  About 2.7% of families and 7.3% of the population were below the poverty line, including 1.7% of those under age 18 and none of those age 65 or over.

Business 
Love Creek is on the east side of the business district of Ben Lomond, along Highway 9.

Government

Transportation 
Santa Cruz Metro Transit Bus Route 35 and 35E goes through Ben Lomond.

Notable people 

 Guillermo Wagner Granizo (1923–1995) ceramic tile muralist, lived in Ben Lomond from the 1970s until 1980.
 Jim Jeffries (1875–1953), boxer, trained in the 1940s at the now defunct Wagon Wheel Bar and Restaurant.

References

External links
 

1887 establishments in California
Census-designated places in California
Census-designated places in Santa Cruz County, California
Populated places established in 1887